Brandon Gignac (born November 7, 1997) is a Canadian professional ice hockey forward for the Laval Rocket of the American Hockey League (AHL).

Playing career
Gignac played major junior hockey with the Shawinigan Cataractes of the Quebec Major Junior Hockey League (QMJHL) before he was selected in the third round, 80th overall, by the New Jersey Devils in the 2016 NHL Entry Draft.

During his final season with the Cataractes in the 2016–17, on November 12, 2016, he signed a three-year, entry-level contract with the Devils. After posting 62 points in 59 regular season games with Shawinigan, Gignac joined the Devils' AHL affiliate, the Albany Devils, on an amateur try-out basis following a first round defeat in the QMJHL playoffs. He made his professional debut in Albany's penultimate regular season game against the Rochester Americans in a 5–4 defeat on April 14, 2017.

In his first professional season, Gignac was assigned by New Jersey to new AHL affiliate, the Binghamton Devils, for their inaugural season in 2017–18. In his first two months, he contributed with just two goals and one assist, while also developing his two-way game before suffering a season-ending knee injury, tearing both his ACL and MCL, on December 13, 2017.

Before the 2018–19 season, Gignac participated in the Devils' training camp. On March 9, 2019, Gignac received his first call-up to the NHL by the Devils and made his NHL debut, making one shot and skating for 9:04 minutes as the Devils lost 4–2 to the New York Rangers.

On July 29, 2021, signed a one-year contract with the Laval Rocket of the American Hockey League (AHL).

Career statistics

Regular season and playoffs

International

References

External links
 

1997 births
Living people
Albany Devils players
Binghamton Devils players
Canadian ice hockey centres
Ice hockey people from Quebec
Jacksonville Icemen players
Laval Rocket players
New Jersey Devils draft picks
New Jersey Devils players
People from Repentigny, Quebec
Shawinigan Cataractes players